Hugo Vidémont (born 19 February 1993) is a French professional footballer who plays as a midfielder for Kazakh club FC Aktobe.

Career
Vidémont made his senior debut with Clermont Foot on 18 May 2012, coming on as a substitute for Romain Alessandrini in the 2–0 win over Laval.

Vidémont joined Ajaccio in January 2015, on the final day of the winter transfer window. On 27 February 2015, he scored his first goal for the club against Le Havre in a 2–1 loss.

In February 2017 he joined Wisła Kraków.

On 12 August 2019, Vidémont joined Lithuanian club FK Žalgiris.

On 1 January 2022, Vidémont left FK Žalgiris in Lithuania to join FC Aktobe in the Kazakhstan Premier League.

References

External links
Hugo Vidémont profile at foot-national.com

1993 births
Living people
Footballers from Marseille
French footballers
Association football midfielders
Clermont Foot players
AC Ajaccio players
Wisła Kraków players
A.F.C. Tubize players
FK Žalgiris players
FC Aktobe players
Ligue 2 players
Ekstraklasa players
A Lyga players
French expatriate footballers
French expatriate sportspeople in Poland
Expatriate footballers in Poland
French expatriate sportspeople in Belgium
Expatriate footballers in Belgium
French expatriate sportspeople in Lithuania
Expatriate footballers in Lithuania
French expatriate sportspeople in Kazakhstan
Expatriate footballers in Kazakhstan